Jaime Fortier (born 23 February 1976) is a Canadian former cross-country skier who competed in the 1998 Winter Olympics and in the 2002 Winter Olympics.

Cross-country skiing results
All results are sourced from the International Ski Federation (FIS).

Olympic Games

World Championships

a.  Cancelled due to extremely cold weather.

World Cup

Season standings

References

1976 births
Living people
Canadian female cross-country skiers
Olympic cross-country skiers of Canada
Cross-country skiers at the 1998 Winter Olympics
Cross-country skiers at the 2002 Winter Olympics